My Only Wish may refer to:

 "My Only Wish" (song), by Jessica Simpson
 "My Only Wish (This Year)", by Britney Spears